Baskett is an unincorporated community and coal town in Henderson County, Kentucky, United States.

History
Baskett had its start in 1888 as a coal town. The community was named for the Baskett family, the original owners of the town site. A post office has been in operation at Baskett since 1890.

References

Unincorporated communities in Henderson County, Kentucky
Unincorporated communities in Kentucky
Coal towns in Kentucky